New Hampshire Route 126 (abbreviated NH 126) is a  north–south state highway in eastern New Hampshire. It runs between the towns of Barrington and Barnstead.

The southern terminus of NH 126 is in Barrington at New Hampshire Route 9, where NH 126 is named Barnstead Road. The northern terminus is in the town of Barnstead at New Hampshire Route 28.

Major intersections

References

External links

 New Hampshire State Route 126 on Flickr

126
Transportation in Strafford County, New Hampshire
Transportation in Belknap County, New Hampshire